Xiuqiella rectangula is a corynexochid trilobite that lived in what is now Chongqing, China during the Nangaoian stage of the Cambrian Period, near the end of Cambrian Stage 3, which lasted from approximately 516 to 513 million years ago.

References

Corynexochida
Cambrian trilobites of Asia
Cambrian genus extinctions